Coyuca de Catalán  is one of the 81 municipalities of Guerrero, in south-western Mexico. The municipal seat lies at Coyuca de Catalán. The municipality covers an area of 921.9 km².

As of 2005, the municipality had a total population of 41,975.

There were 234 confirmed cases and 24 deaths related to the COVID-19 as of February 24, 2021.

Geography

Towns and villages
In 2005 there were 376 settlements. The largest are as follows:

Administration

Municipal presidents

Organized crime
A group of gunmen entered Puerto El Bálsamo, burning 60 houses and looting 15 vinatas (mezcal factories) in 2020. 
320 mezcal producers left the town of Zihuaquio on January 26, 2020 after attacks by criminal groups operating in the area. Mezcal provides income in several towns, but due to constant confrontations between alleged drug traffickers, people have had to leave and cannot harvest their crops.

Two women who had been kidnapped by La Familia Michoacana and eight members of the cartel were killed in a confrontation between members of the cartel and townspeople of Hacienda de Dolores on February 25, 2021.

Residents of Los Guajes de Ayala used social media in June 2021 to ask for federal help after three days of being held hostage by La Familia Michoacana. The area is in the middle of the gold and the drug trade.

References

Municipalities of Guerrero